Anis al-Qaq (Arabic: القاق، أنيس‎)  (born June 1, 1947) is a former dentist, Palestinian Authority Deputy minister and ambassador.

Early life and career
Anis al-Qaq received a BSc in Dentistry from the University of Baghdad in 1971. After his graduation he opened a private clinic in Jerusalem. From 1982 to 1984 he continued his education in Buckinghamshire, UK, specializing in Oral surgery.

Other activities:

1985–90 Chairman of the Dental Association in the West Bank. 
1986–90 Head of the Professionals’ Union 
1989–   chairman of the Board of Trustees of the Palestinian National Theater in Jerusalem
1989–   Executive Member, Council for Higher Education 
1989–   President of the Palestinian-Swedish Friendship Society 
1989–   Secretary General of the Health Services Council
1989–   Board Member of the International Coordinating Committee on the Question of Palestine (ICCP) 
1989–   Member of the Coordinating Committee for NGOs on the Question of Palestine in the Occupied Palestinian Territories 
1989–   Member of the Palestinian Medical School Committee 
2002–   Co-chairperson International Forum for Peace
2004–   Member of the editorial board of the Palestine–Israel Journal
2004–   President of the Center for Health Services in Jerusalem

Politics
Al-Qaq became Deputy Assistant to the PA Minister of Planning and International Cooperation in 1994. He became ambassador of the Palestinian National Authority to Switzerland in 2003. In 2009 he retired from politics.

In 2002 he founded with Ofer Bronchtein, the International Forum for Peace which aims to promote dialogue between Israelis and Palestinians, Europeans and Mediterraneans, and implement cultural, economic and Social development projects.

Family and personal life
Anis al-Qaq is married to Dutch diplomat and politician Sigrid Kaag, leader of the Democrats 66 since 4 September 2020. He has six children.

See also
Education in the State of Palestine
Healthcare in the State of Palestine

References

1947 births
Fatah members
Palestine Liberation Organization
Palestine Liberation Organization members
Palestinian Arab nationalists
Palestinian Muslims
Palestinian nationalists
People of the Israeli–Palestinian conflict
Living people